Saša Lukić (born 13 August 1996) is a Serbian professional footballer who plays as a midfielder for English club Fulham and the Serbia national team.

Early life
Lukić was born in Varna, a village near Šabac, Serbia, FR Yugoslavia on 13 August 1996.

Club career

Partizan
Lukić started playing football at POFK Savacium, a football school in Šabac, before joining Partizan as a trainee in August 2009. He signed his first professional contract for the club in August 2013 on his 17th birthday, signing a three-year deal.

Loan to Teleoptik
In order to gain senior experience, Lukić was immediately loaned to Teleoptik. He played regularly for the Opticians in the 2013–14 season, making 23 league appearances and scoring three goals, as the club failed to avoid relegation.

Return to Partizan
On 16 May 2015, Lukić made his competitive debut for Partizan and played the full match in a 1–1 home league draw with Novi Pazar. On 17 July 2015, he entered in the game against Metalac, replacing Stefan Babović in first game of 2015–16 Serbian SuperLiga. On 8 August, he scored his first official goal for Partizan in the final minutes of a 2–1 home win over Spartak Subotica. Two weeks later, he scored his second goal for Partizan in 3–1 away league win over Borac Čačak. On 26 August 2015, Lukić made his debut in the UEFA Champions League in the second leg of the play-off round against BATE Borisov. On 22 October, he played his first match in UEFA Europa League group stage against Athletic Bilbao. In the absence of some players he captained the team for several games.

Torino
On 29 July 2016, Lukić was signed by Italian club Torino. On 17 October, he made his debut in Serie A in a 4–1 win away to Palermo, replacing Mirko Valdifiori.

Levante (loan)
On 15 August 2017, Lukić was loaned to La Liga side Levante, for one year.

Fulham 
On 31 January 2023, Lukić joined Premier League side Fulham for an undisclosed fee, signing a four-and-a-half-year deal with the English club.

International career
Lukić made his debut for the Serbia U21 national team during the 2017 UEFA Under-21 Championship qualification, coming on as a substitute in a 5–0 home victory over Lithuania on 8 September 2015.

On 7 September 2018, he made his debut for the Serbia senior national team in a 1–0 win against Lithuania.

In November 2022, he was selected in Serbia's squad for the 2022 FIFA World Cup in Qatar. He played in all three group stage matches, against Brazil, Cameroon, and Switzerland. Serbia finished fourth in the group.

Style of play
Lukić is a quick, hardworking, versatile with good vision, passing, and technique and well-rounded midfielder, who is also capable of playing in several positions, due to his ability to aid his team both offensively and defensively. A right-footed player, he is usually deployed as a creative attacking midfielder, due to his vision, passing, technique, and striking ability, as well as his adeptness at making attacking runs.

Career statistics

Club

International

Scores and results list Serbia's goal tally first, score column indicates score after each Lukić goal.

Honours
Partizan
 Serbian SuperLiga: 2014–15
 Serbian Cup: 2015–16

References

External links
Profile at the Fulham F.C. website
 
 
 

Living people
1996 births
Sportspeople from Šabac
Association football midfielders
Serbian footballers
2022 FIFA World Cup players
Serbia international footballers
Serbia under-21 international footballers
Serbia youth international footballers
Serie A players
La Liga players
Serbian SuperLiga players
Serbian First League players
FK Partizan players
FK Teleoptik players
Torino F.C. players
Levante UD footballers
Fulham F.C. players
Serbian expatriate footballers
Serbian expatriate sportspeople in Italy
Serbian expatriate sportspeople in Spain
Serbian expatriate sportspeople in England
Expatriate footballers in Italy
Expatriate footballers in Spain
Expatriate footballers in England